The 1972–73 New York Nets season was the sixth season of the franchise.

Roster

Final standings

Playoffs
Eastern Division Semifinals vs. Carolina Cougars

Nets lose series, 4–1

References

External links
1972 draft picks

New York Nets season
New Jersey Nets seasons
New York Nets
New York Nets
Sports in Hempstead, New York